Twenty Ten is a two-disc retrospective album by Australian singer and songwriter Guy Sebastian. Disc one contains 18 songs from his previous five albums and two new songs, including the lead single "Who's That Girl" which features American rapper Eve. Disc two has acoustic versions of ten of the songs. The album was released in Australia on 19 November 2010 and reached number four on the ARIA Album Chart, Sebastian's sixth consecutive top ten album. It was certified platinum in its fourth week of release and was the fifth highest selling Australian artist album of 2010. It reached 2× platinum certification in 2014. "Who's That Girl" reached number one on the ARIA Singles Chart and achieved 5× platinum certification, and was Sebastian's fifth of six number one singles in Australia. It won the Highest Selling Single ARIA Award in 2011, and received nominations for Single of the Year and Best Pop Release. Sebastian was also nominated as Most Popular Australian Artist. "Who's That Girl" also reached number one and Platinum certification in New Zealand.

Background
While Sebastian's recording career has been relatively short, prior to this album he had released five top ten albums which produced ten top fifty singles. Nine of these singles peaked inside the top 15 of the ARIA singles charts, with six reaching the top ten including four number ones. The earliest indication that he would be releasing a retrospective album came in October 2010 when it was revealed he had recorded a new single titled "Who's That Girl". The artwork of the album was revealed shortly after, along with the official track listing.

Sebastian said in an interview with the Daily Telegraph, "It's weird to have a best of, I've only been doing this for seven or eight years. I guess it's one of those things, the record company contract finishes and they've got that in their artillery." In the EPK for the release Sebastian said, "We put together more of a compilation that was packaged in a way that was different. I put 20 of the songs on and then got ten of them and did totally different versions. It gives the fans something else, and takes them back too through that journey" As Sebastian has recorded songs in a variety of genres on his five previous albums, the songs on Twenty Ten range from pop, pop rock, funk, R&B, jazz, gospel through to soul. He said "I have a really eclectic taste in music, so in the best of there are so many styles". The release of Twenty Ten completed Sebastian's original contract he signed when he first won Australian Idol in 2003. In November 2010 he was re-signed by Sony Music for another long-term contract.

Music

Disc one
All of Sebastian's released singles have been included on the first disc, and also some of his favourite album tracks, plus two new songs. The lead single "Who's That Girl" featuring Eve is a dance flavoured electro R&B song, a change in style for Sebastian. The second new song is the soul ballad "If I Really Loved you". The three songs from Sebastian's 6× platinum debut album Just As I Am included on the album are "Angels Brought Me Here", "All I Need Is You" and album track "My Beautiful Friend". "Angels Brought Me Here" was Sebastian's debut song after winning the inaugural Australian Idol competition in 2003. It reached number one the ARIA Singles Chart and was certified 4× platinum. It was the highest selling song in Australia in 2003, and in 2010 ARIA announced it was the highest selling song of the previous decade. Sebastian said, "The success of the song still hasn't sunk in after 7 years. [...] I love the song, will never tire of it, and I love that my country has enabled me to keep doing what I do." Up until 2011 "Angels Brought Me Here" had the highest recorded sales for an Australian artist single in chart history. "All I Need Is You" is a pop song written by Sebastian before he entered Australian Idol, which also reached number one and achieved platinum certification. "Climb Every Mountain" was performed by Sebastian during the Idol competition. When Idol's musical director John Foreman left the show in 2009 he named it as one of his favourite moments during his six years on Idol. Sebastian recorded the song with the Sydney International Orchestra and it was included as a "B" side on "All I Need Is You".

Sebastian's second album Beautiful Life was prodomiently R&B, with many of the songs co-written with American writers. "Out with My Baby", "Kryptonite" and "Oh Oh" are the songs included on Twenty Ten. "Out with My Baby", co-written with Robin Thicke, is an uptempo funk R&B song which became Sebastian's third number one single and was certified platinum. "Oh Oh" is also funk R&B, while Kryptonite is an R&B ballad. His third album Closer to the Sun was a mix of a number of different genres including pop rock, R&B, jazz and soul, and was co-written mainly with Australian songwriters. The tracks included on Twenty Ten are the gospel tinged ballad "Taller, Stronger, Better", the pop-rock "Elevator Love", the R&B balad "Cover on My Heart" and the album title track "Closer to the Sun". In 2007 Sebastian travelled to Memphis, Tennessee to record a tribute album of Memphis soul classics with Steve Cropper and other members of American soul band The MGs at Ardent Studios. The MGs also came to Australia in early 2008 to be his backing band for his National tour. Although no singles were released from The Memphis Album it achieved double platinum certification. Sebastian has included two of the tracks on Twenty Ten, "Hold On, I'm Comin'" and "Take Me to the River".

Like it Like That, Sebastian's fifth album, was an original modern soul album which showed the influences of his Memphis soul phase. John Mayer's band members including David Ryan Harris were the musicians on some of the songs, and John Mayer himself played guitar and sang background vocals on three of the tracks. Five of the songs from this album are included on the retrospective album. "Like it Like That", a soul infused track with a surf-pop feel became Sebastian's fourth number one single and was the highest selling Australian Artist song in 2009, eventually reaching 4× platinum certification. Sebastian said of the song, "I think "Like It Like That" is the most I've ever sat back and gone 'I can't believe this is my life. I can't believe it's happening and radio's all over it.' It blew my mind." "Art of Love", a R&B ballad featuring Jordin Sparks, was a top 10 double platinum certified single. The other three songs from Like It Like That are "All to Myself", "Never Hold You Down" and "Attention".

Disc two
Sebastian co-produced the acoustic tracks on the second disc with his longtime guitarist friend Carl Dimatago. Sebastian stated, "People can make their own albums with digital downloads by just dragging their choice of songs into their music folder, so I think artists have to be much more creative in terms of how they put together these kind of albums. Since a lot of my fans already have my songs, I wanted to be able to offer up something completely new within the package. I recorded ten of the songs acoustically, which is something I always wanted to do, and I did it in such a way that I wanted to breathe new life into the songs by changing the arrangements around." Sebastian's self-confessed eclectic taste in music is evident throughout the acoustic songs. For example, "Elevator Love", originally a pop/rock track, now has a reggae lilt, and the once effervescent pop "All I Need Is You" becomes a slowed down soul ballad. There are jazz influences evident in several tracks including Sebastian scatting in "Oh Oh".

Release and promotion
"Who's That Girl" was serviced to Australian radio stations on 5 November 2010 and was the most added song in its second week. It peaked at number 13 in national radio airplay. Eve came to Australia to film the music video with Sebastian, and they performed the song on the grand final of the Seven Network's The X Factor on 22 November 2010, which was televised in Australia and New Zealand. During December 2010 and January 2011 "Who's That Girl" was used by the Seven Network to promote the new season of Desperate Housewives. After The X Factor finished Sebastian made a short promotional trip to Auckland, New Zealand, for an instore appearance and media interviews. On his return to Australia he performed on the Hamish and Andy Thank You Tour in Sydney in early December.

Sebastian also performed at a private event to welcome Oprah Winfrey to Sydney during her trip to Australia. During the special Oprah! The Interview which screened on Network Ten on 14 December, Winfrey was shown in the front row of the audience while Sebastian was singing "Who's That Girl". Sebastian sang for Winfrey a second time when she requested he perform at her private crew wrap up party before she left Australia. Although no footage appeared of that performance it was reported in the media at the time. It was also reported Winfrey wanted Sebastian to appear on The Oprah Winfrey Show in January 2011 but scheduling difficulties had prevented it. An article with a comprehensive interview with him is featured on the official Oprah site.

On Australia Day 2011, Sebastian performed "Who's That Girl" during Channel Nine's Today at Suncorp Stadium in Brisbane, and was the headline act at the AusSounds Australia Day Concert at the Brisbane Convention and Exhibition Centre. In March and April he was the support act for Lionel Richie's tour of Australia and New Zealand. He spent the next few months in the US, returning to Australia for The X Factor. On the first live show in September Sebastian sang "Who's That Girl" as part of a judge's medley. In November 2011, Sebastian performed at the ARIA Awards for the second year in succession, where he sang a medley of "Who's That Girl" and his most recent single "Don't Worry Be Happy".

Singles
"Who's That Girl" was released on 5 November 2010 and was Twenty Ten'''s only single in Australia. It reached number one on the ARIA Singles Chart and was the second highest selling Australian artist single in 2010, and the fifth highest selling one in 2011.Top 50 Australian Artist Singles 2011. Australian Recording Industry Association. Archived from the original on 2 February 2012. It won the Highest Selling Single ARIA Award in 2011 and achieved 5× platinum certification in 2014. This was his fifth of six number one singles and Sebastian is currently the only Australian male artist in Australian music history to achieve six number one singles, and he is third overall for all Australian acts. Only Kylie Minogue and Delta Goodrem have more. "Who's That Girl" also reached number one and platinum certification in New Zealand, his second number one single there.

"Like It Like That" was released to radio in New Zealand as Twenty Tens second single there in early 2011, and peaked at number 30 on the New Zealand Singles Chart and achieved gold certification.

Critical reception
The album received positive reviews. Jamie Horne, a music reviewer with The Border Mail said, "The inaugural winner's longevity (he has released five albums) can be attributed to the fact that he's an accomplished musician and songwriter [...] A 10-track acoustic disc with the hits reworked (check the swinging take of Like It Like That) and a couple of newies including the dancefloor-ready Who's That Girl with US rapper Eve should make it clear that the former 'Fro' is not that uncool after all". David Lim, a music journalist and announcer on radio station Joy 94.9 wrote when reporting on the album's chart debut, "Twenty Ten – debuts at #9. Still not good enough. Take my word for it, the acoustic disc is totally worth emptying your coin purse for". Chris Havercroft from X-Press Magazine said, "He dabbles in throwaway pop with Elevator Love and shows off his Memphis chops with Hold on I'm Coming. It is the dancefloor where Sebastian does his most damage and when teaming up with rapper Eve for new single 'Who's That Girl' he shows his knack for targeting his audience. Love him or loathe him, upon listening to Twenty Ten it's hard to deny that Sebastian has quite the set of pipes on him". The Daily Telegraph music editor Kathy McCabe wrote, "Sebastian has matured into a genuine hitmaker, his gift with melody so finely-honed he can pretty much punch out a catchy number in his sleep." AllMusic reviewer Jon O'brien said, "it's a testament to his vocal abilities and songwriting skills that, unlike many of his fellow winners, he's remained popular enough to see out his rather ambitious Sony contract, scoring five number ones since his victory in 2003. This comprehensive two-disc, 30-track collection, which reveals a subtle and natural progression with each album, explains why he's managed to survive once the show's publicity machine died down."

Accolades
"Who's That Girl" and "All to Myself" were shortlisted for the 2011 APRA Song of the Year, with "Art of Love" shortlisted the previous year.Voting Now Open For APRA's 'Song Of The Year' Award. musicfeeds.com.au. 18 March 2010. Archived from the original on 21 January 2012. "Who's That Girl" won the 2011 APRA Award for Urban Work of the Year and received peer voted ARIA Music Award nominations for Single of the Year and Best Pop Release.Kelton, Sam (22 June 2011). Our Guy, his girl crowned the best. Adelaide Now. Archived from the original on 21 January 2012.

Commercial performance
Twenty Ten was released on 19 November 2010 and debuted on the ARIA Albums Chart at number nine, and reached a peak of number four in its seventh week. It spent 18 weeks in the ARIA top 50, including 12 weeks in the top ten. It became the fifth highest selling Australian artist album in Australia in 2010 within six weeks of release and achieved 2× platinum certification in 2014. Twenty Ten also reached No. 24 on the New Zealand Albums Chart.

Track listing

Personnel
Credits are adapted from album liner notes.Disc oneLead vocals (all tracks) – Guy Sebastian

"Who's That Girl"
Featured rap – Eve
Production – Guy Sebastian, Andre Harris
"If I Really Loved You"
Background vocals – Guy Sebastian
Production – Adre Harris

"Like It Like That" (Radio edit)
Background vocals – David Ryan Harris, CC White
Guitar – Joshua Lopez,
Bass – Sean Hurley
Farlisa organ and piano – Zac Rae
Drums – JJ Johnson
Trumpet – Jumaane Smith
Tenor saxophone – Bob Reynolds
Baritone saxophone – David Moyer
Production – David Ryan Harris, Fredrik Odesjo, Andreas Levander
Engineering – Billy Bush
Mixing – Fredrik Odesjo, Rob Kinelski

"All to Myself" (Radio mix)
Background vocals – David Ryan Harris, Angel Taylor
Guitar – John Mayer, Joshua Lopez, Michael Chaves
Bass – Sean Hurley
Piano, B3 organ, clavinet – Zac Rae
Trumpet – Jumaane Smith
Tenor saxophone – Bob Reynolds
Baritone saxophone – David Moyer
Drums, tambourine – JJ Johnson
Mellotron, glockenspiel – David Ryan Harris
Instrumental arrangements – Fredrik Odesjo, Andreas Levander, Guy Sebastian
Production – David Ryan Harris, Fredrik Odesjo, Andreas Levander
Engineering – Billy Bush
Mixing – Rob Kinelski

"All I Need Is You"
Background vocals – Guy Sebastian
Guitars – Peter Northcote
Bass – Alex Hewetson
Production – Bryon Jones, Adam Reily
Programming – Ramish Sathiah, Adam Reily
Mixing – Craig Porteils

"Angels Brought Me Here"
Background vocals – Guy Sebastian
Guitars – Peter Northgate
String arrangements – Bruce Heald
Production – Bryon Jones, Adam Reily
Engineering – Craig Porteils
Programming – Adam Reily
Mixing – Steve MacMillan

"Out with My Baby"
Background vocals and vocal arrangements – Guy Sebastian
All instrumentation – Projay
Production – Robin Thicke, Projay
Engineering – Projay
Mixing – Dave Pensado

"Oh Oh"
Background vocals and vocal arrangements – Guy Sebastian
Saxophone – Brad Evens
Other instrumentation and programming – Jarrad Rogers
Production, engineering – Jarrad Rogers
Mixing – Jon Gass

"Taller, Stronger, Better" (Radio mix)
Vocals – Guy Sebastian
Background vocals – Guy Sebastian, Gary Pinto, Susie Ahern
Vocal production and arrangement – Guy Sebastian, Gary Pinto
Vocal engineering – Carl J Shubert
Production, programming and arrangements – Phil Turcio
Guitars – Simon Hosford
Orchestra – Victorian Philharmonic Orchestra
Orchestral arrangement – Phil Turcio, Chong Lim
Conductor – Chong Lim
Orchestral engineering – Robin Gray
Mixing – Ross Cockle

"Cover on My Heart" (Radio mix)
Background vocals – Guy Sebastian
Vocal arrangement and engineering – Peer Astrom, Anders Bagge
Additional vocal engineering – Carl J Shubert
Guitars – Sebastian Nylund
Orchestra – Victorian Philharmonic Orchestra
String arrangement, Conducting – Chong Lim
Orchestral engineering – Robin Gray
Other instrumentation and programming – Peer Astrom, Anders Bagge
Production – Peer Astrom, Anders Bagge

"Closer to the Sun"
Background vocals – Guy Sebastian
Guitars – Jack Jones, Carl Dimataga
Production – James Roche, Guy Sebastian
Mixing – James Roche
 
"Elevator Love" 
Background vocals – Guy Sebastian
Guitar – David Carr
Drums – Damien Rogers
Production and engineering – Jarrad Rogers
Mixing – Mark Needham, Will Brierre

"Art of Love"
Featured vocals – Jordin Sparks
Piano, keyboards – Adam Reily
Beats, bass and programming – Stuart Critchton
Production – Stuart Critchton, Adam Reily, Guy Sebastian
Engineering – Bojan Dugic
Mixing – Phil Tan

"Attention"
Saxophone – Bjorn Almgren
Other instrumentation and arrangements – Fredrik Odesjo, Andreas Levander, Guy Sebastian
Production – Fredrik Odesjo, Andreas Levander
Mixing – Fredrik Odesjo, Rob Kinelski

"Hold on I'm Comin'" and "Take Me to the River"
Background vocals – Susan Marshall, Jackie Johnson
Background vocal arrangements – Guy Sebastian
Guitar – Steve Cropper, Dave Smith
Extra guitar parts – Carl Dimitago
Bass – Donald "Duck" Dunn
Drums – Steve Potts
Piano, keyboard, horn arrangements – Lester Snell
Organ – Rick Steff
Tenor saxophone – Jim Spake
Baritone Saxophone – Kirk Smothers
Trumpet – Scott Thompson
Trombone – Howard Lamb
Production – Steve Cropper, Guy Sebastian
Engineering – Curry Weber, Alan Burcham
Mixing – Steve Greenwell

"Climb Every Mountain"
Background vocals – Darren Percival, Shauna Jensen
Orchestra – Sydney International Orchestra
Production, orchestration and conducting – John Foreman
Engineering and mixing – Tod Deeley, Braddon Williams

"Kryptonite" (Radio edit)
Background vocals and vocal arrangements – Guy Sebastian
Guitars – Grecco Buratto
Other instruments – Beau Dozzier
String and horn arrangements – John Foreman, Braddon Williams
Production and programming – Beau Dozzier
Engineering – Richard Lush
Mixing – Dave Pensado

"Never Hold You Down"
Background vocals – CC White
Guitar – Joshua Lopez
Keyboard – Zac Rae
Trumpet – Jumaane Smith
Tenor saxophone – Bob Reynolds
Violin – Mary Kathryne VanOsdale, David Davidson
Viola – Monissa Angell
Cello – John Catchings
String arrangements – Calvin Turner
Production – Fredrik Odesjo
Mixing – John Fields
Additional programming – Fredrik Odesjo, Andreas Levander

"My Beautiful Friend" 
Background vocals – Guy Sebastian, Gary Pinto
Guitars – Peter Northgate
Programming – Adam Reily
String arrangements – Adam Reily, Bruce Heald
Engineering – Craig Porteils
Mixing – David HemmingDisc twoAll tracks'''
Vocals and piano – Guy Sebastian
Guitars and ukuleles – Carl Dimatago
Percussion, drums, tin cans, spoons and wood logs – Terapai Richmond
Double bass – Adam Ventoura
Flutes and saxophones – Matt Ottignon
String arrangements – Calvin Turner
Production – Guy Sebastian, Carl Dimataga
Engineering – James "Shimmy" Griffiths

Charts

Weekly charts

Year-end charts

Decade-end charts

Certification

Release history

References

2010 compilation albums
Guy Sebastian albums
Sony Music Australia albums